The Other Side of Daybreak is a compilation album by Beth Orton, released by Astralwerks in 2003. It is mainly a collection of b-sides from the singles found on 2002's Daybreaker, along with some remixes of tracks from the album.

Track listing
"Ooh Child" (alternate version) – 3:53  	   	
"Thinking About Tomorrow" (IPG Dub Remix) – 5:49 		
"Ali's Waltz" – 3:25 		
"Daybreaker" (Four Tet Remix) – 5:05 		
"Bobby Gentry" – 5:30 		
"Carmella" (Four Tet Remix) – 11:38 		
"Beautiful World" – 4:06 		
"Concrete Sky" (acoustic; recorded live at WXRT Chicago, 4 June 2002) – 4:59 		
"Daybreaker" (Roots Manuva Remix) – 4:34 		
"Anywhere" (Two Lone Swordsmen Remix Vocal) – 5:55
Some versions are enhanced CDs that include the video for either "Anywhere (Two Lone Swordsmen Remix Edit)" or "Concrete Sky (Version 2)."

References

Beth Orton albums
B-side compilation albums
Albums produced by Victor Van Vugt
2003 compilation albums
Astralwerks compilation albums